Khakassian State University named after N. F. Katanov (KhSU) is a public university located in the city of Abakan, Russia. It is the largest higher educational institution of the Republic of Khakassia. The university cooperates with many universities in Siberia and provides training for foreign students. The main task of the university is to provide Khakassia and the south of the Krasnoyarsk Krai, as well as Tuva with highly qualified personnel.

History
The university was founded on April 16, 1939, on the initiative of the People's Commissariat of Education of the RSFSR as a teacher's institute. From September 1939, 100 students began to study pedagogical sciences. Their mentors were 15 teachers. The Institute had three faculties: Russian Language and Literature; historical; physical and mathematical; education lasted only two years, the main task was to train personnel for secondary schools in Khakassia.

On February 10, 1944, the Abakan State Pedagogical Institute was opened on the basis of the teacher's institute. After 5 years of study, graduates became certified specialists and could work both in the USSR and abroad.

In 1990, a special faculty for the training of practical psychologists was created at the ASPI and existed until 1996. Since 1992, the institute began teaching Chinese students. In the same year, the Abakan Pedagogical Institute was named after Nikolay Katanov, a Turkologist, folklorist, ethnographer, public figure, the first Khakassian scientist.

On June 19, 1994, the institution was transformed into a state university. For 25 years of its activity, KhSU has produced about 50,000 specialists in various fields.

Nowadays, there are 9 institutes in the structure of the university, where there are 30 bachelor's and 13 master's programs. There are also 4 colleges at KhSU. The university campus consists of 15 academic buildings and 10 hostels in the city center.

References

Literature 
 Большой энциклопедический словарь Красноярского края [Great Encyclopedic Dictionary of the Krasnoyarsk Krai] / гл. ред. А. П. Статейнов. Красноярск : Буква С, 2010. Т. 2 : [Административно-территориальное деление. Населенные пункты. Предприятия и организации]. pp. 473–474. 515 p. (in Russian).

External links 
 Official site

Universities in Siberia
Educational institutions established in 1939
Abakan
1939 establishments in Russia
Public universities and colleges in Russia